eStat.cz is a think tank based in the Czech Republic. Its focus is an efficient government and public services. It was founded in 2004.

History
eStat.cz was founded in 2004 by Edvard Kožušník and Michal Tošovský. Leader of the Civic Democratic Party Mirek Topolánek also initiated foundation of the think tank.

eStat.cz started its Internet television in 2008. Some media called it a television of the Civic Democratic Party. eStat.cz television was used by Mirek Topolánek and Pavel Bém. Ivo Brokeš from eStat.cz stated that politicians from other parties can use it too.

eStat.cz also fought against ratification of Lisbon Treaty. They argued that the treaty gives too much power to the European Commission and leads to European superstate.

References

Civic Democratic Party (Czech Republic)
Think tanks based in the Czech Republic
2004 establishments in the Czech Republic